Baxter House may refer to the following places in the United States (listed by state, then city):

 Baxter House (Pueblo, Colorado), listed on the National Register of Historic Places (NRHP) in Colorado
 Barlow Baxter House, Hestand, Kentucky, listed on the NRHP in Kentucky
 Baxter Summer Home, Falmouth, Maine, NRHP-listed
 Baxter House (Gorham, Maine), NRHP-listed
 Capt. Rodney J. Baxter House, Barnstable, Massachusetts, NRHP-listed
 Capt. Sylvester Baxter House, Barnstable, Massachusetts, NRHP-listed
 Charles L. Baxter House, Barnstable, Massachusetts, NRHP-listed
 Shubael Baxter House, Barnstable, Massachusetts, NRHP-listed
 Baxter–King House, Quincy, Massachusetts, NRHP-listed
 Stoothoff–Baxter–Kouwenhaven House, New York, NY, NRHP-listed
 James Baxter House, Amberley Village, Ohio, NRHP-listed
 Baxter House (Dayton, Oregon), NRHP-listed
 David and Drusilla Baxter House, Orem, Utah, NRHP-listed
 Baxter House (Edom, Virginia), NRHP-listed